Sivashri Kungaraja Kurukkal was the head pandit of the Koneswaram temple of Trincomalee, Sri Lanka who was shot dead by suspected Liberation Tigers of Tamil Eelam (LTTE) gunmen on September 21, 2008.

External links
Unlawful, say ethnic Tamils The Hindu - September 22, 2008
High Priest of Thirukoneswaram Temple shot and killed Asian Tribune - September 22, 2008

2008 deaths
Sri Lankan Tamil priests
Sri Lankan Hindus
Hindu martyrs
Assassinated Sri Lankan people
Year of birth missing